Rościn may refer to the following places in West Pomeranian Voivodeship, Poland:

Rościn, Choszczno County
Rościn, Myślibórz County